Queensland Lions Football Club, known as Lions FC, is a football (soccer) club based in Brisbane, Australia. Founded in 1957 as Hollandia Inala Soccer Club, the club currently competes in the National Premier Leagues Queensland.

History

The club was founded in 1957 as Hollandia-Inala Soccer Club by Dutch immigrants. From the start they were based at grounds in the Brisbane suburb of Darra and then moved to Pine Road, Richlands, where they play today. In the early 1970s, all clubs were required to abandon 'ethnic' names and they then adopted the name Brisbane Lions.

In 1977 the Lions were invited to play in the National Soccer League and played in the league as Brisbane Lions until the end of the 1988 season. Former Manchester United and Northern Ireland legend George Best made four appearances for the team during the 1983/84 season. From 1989 the Brisbane Lions played in the Brisbane Premier League. After coming to an agreement with the newly formed Brisbane Lions AFL club, they changed their name to the current Queensland Lions.

In 2004 it was announced that the Lions had won the right to compete in the newly formed A-League. Operating as Queensland Roar the club was once again represented in an Australian national league.

Re-formation 
Subsequent changes to the ownership structure of the Roar allowed the Queensland Lions to re-enter the Brisbane competition in Premier Division 1 in 2008.

In 2012, Lions FC was accepted into the inaugural 2013 Brisbane Premier League, the top local competition in the Brisbane region. In 2016, the club went back-to-back claiming the premiership and Grand Final.

When the National Premier Leagues Queensland expanded in 2018, Lions FC were one of the clubs to join the competition. In its first season in the NPLQ, Lions won the league and grand final double. In 2019, the club followed it up with a back-to-back premiership, winning the league with 2 games to spare. However, in the finals series, Lions went down 2–1 to Olympic FC in the semi-final.

Current squad

Youth

Players who have been featured in a first-team matchday squad for Lions in a competitive match

Club officials

Technical staff

Honours
National Premier Leagues Queensland **Premiers 2022
National Premier Leagues Queensland **Champions 2018, 2020, 2021
Brisbane Premier League
Premiers 1968, 1973, 1974, 1975, 1987, 1990, 1991, 1996, 2002, 2003, 2004, 2013, 2015, 2016; 
Champions 1967, 1969, 1987, 1991, 1996, 1998, 2002, 2003, 2004, 2016, 2017
 Queensland State Cup – Winner 2004
Brisbane Premier Cup – Winner 2002, 2003
Canale Cup – Winner 2012, 2015

References

External links
 Official Website
 OZ Football profile

Association football clubs established in 1957
National Soccer League (Australia) teams
Soccer clubs in Brisbane
1957 establishments in Australia
Queensland Lions
Diaspora sports clubs in Australia
Dutch-Australian culture